Gekko gulat is a species of gecko. It is endemic to Palawan in the Philippines.

References

Gekko
Reptiles described in 2010
Reptiles of the Philippines
Endemic fauna of the Philippines
Fauna of Palawan